Calorie restriction (caloric restriction or energy restriction) is a dietary regimen that reduces intake of energy from caloric foods & beverages without incurring malnutrition. "Reduce" can be defined relative to the subject's previous intake before intentionally restricting food or beverage consumption, or relative to an average person of similar body type.

Calorie restriction is typically adopted intentionally to reduce body weight. It is recommended as a possible regimen by US dietary guidelines and scientific societies for body weight control.

Health effects

Recommendations 

Caloric intake control, and reduction for overweight individuals, is recommended by US dietary guidelines and science-based societies. Calorie restriction is recommended for people with diabetes and prediabetes, in combination with physical exercise and a weight loss goal of 5-15% for diabetes and 7-10% for prediabetes to prevent progression to diabetes. Mild calorie restriction may be beneficial for pregnant women to reduce weight gain (without weight loss) and reduce perinatal risks for both the mother and child.

Risks of malnutrition
The term "calorie restriction" as used in the study of aging refers to dietary regimens that reduce calorie intake without incurring malnutrition. If a restricted diet is not designed to include essential nutrients, malnutrition may result in serious deleterious effects, as shown in the Minnesota Starvation Experiment. This study was conducted during World War II on a group of lean men, who restricted their calorie intake by 45% for six months and composed roughly 77% of their diet with carbohydrates. As expected, this malnutrition resulted in metabolic adaptations, such as decreased body fat, improved lipid profile, and decreased resting heart rate. The experiment also caused negative effects, such as anemia, edema, muscle wasting, weakness, dizziness, irritability, lethargy, and depression.

Typical low-calorie diets may not supply sufficient nutrient intake that is typically included in a calorie restriction diet.

Side effects
People losing weight during calorie restriction risk developing side effects, such as cold sensitivity, menstrual irregularities, infertility, or hormonal changes.

Research

Humans
While calorie restriction has beneficial effects, especially in relation to weight and fat loss, the precise amount of calorie intake and associated fat mass for optimal health in humans is not known. It is conceivable that even moderate amounts of calorie restriction might have harmful effects on certain population groups, such as lean people with low body fat.

Non-human primates

A calorie restriction study started in 1987 by the National Institute on Aging showed that calorie restriction did not extend years of life or reduce age-related deaths in non-obese rhesus macaques. It did improve certain measures of health, however. These results were publicized as being different from the Wisconsin rhesus macaque calorie restriction study, which also started in 1987 and showed an increase in the lifespan of rhesus macaques following calorie restriction.

In a 2017 report on rhesus monkeys, caloric restriction in the presence of adequate nutrition was effective in delaying the effects of aging. Older age of onset, female sex, lower body weight and fat mass, reduced food intake, diet quality, and lower fasting blood glucose levels were factors associated with fewer disorders of aging and with improved survival rates. Specifically, reduced food intake was beneficial in adult and older primates, but not in younger monkeys. The study indicated that caloric restriction provided health benefits with fewer age-related disorders in elderly monkeys and, because rhesus monkeys are genetically similar to humans, the benefits and mechanisms of caloric restriction may apply to human health during aging.

Life extension
As of 2021, intermittent fasting and calorie restriction remain under preliminary research to assess the possible effects on disease burden and increased lifespan during aging, although the relative risks associated with long-term fasting or calorie restriction remain undetermined.

Intermittent fasting refers to periods with intervals during which no food but only clear fluids are ingested – such as a period of daily time-restricted eating with a window of 8 to 12 hours for any caloric intake – and could be combined with overall calorie restriction and variants of the Mediterranean diet which may contribute to long-term cardiovascular health and longevity.

Activity levels
Calorie restriction preserves muscle tissue in nonhuman primates and rodents. Mechanisms include reduced muscle cell apoptosis and inflammation; protection against or adaptation to age-related mitochondrial abnormalities; and preserved muscle stem cell function. Muscle tissue grows when stimulated, so it has been suggested that the calorie-restricted test animals exercised more than their companions on higher calories, perhaps because animals enter a foraging state during calorie restriction. However, studies show that overall activity levels are no higher in calorie restriction than ad libitum animals in youth. Laboratory rodents placed on a calorie restriction diet tend to exhibit increased activity levels (particularly when provided with exercise equipment) at feeding time. Monkeys undergoing calorie restriction also appear more restless immediately before and after meals.

Sirtuin-mediated mechanism 

Preliminary research indicates that sirtuins are activated by fasting and serve as "energy sensors" during metabolism. Sirtuins, specifically Sir2 (found in yeast) have been implicated in the aging of yeast, and are a class of highly conserved, NAD+-dependent histone deacetylase enzymes. Sir2 homologs have been identified in a wide range of organisms from bacteria to humans.

Hormesis

Some research has pointed toward hormesis as an explanation for the possible outcomes of calorie restriction, representing possible mechanisms linked to a low-intensity biological stressor, such as reduced calorie intake.

Intensive care
, current clinical guidelines recommend that hospitals ensure that the patients get fed with 80–100% of energy expenditure, the normocaloric feeding. A systematic review investigated whether people in hospitals' intensive care units have different outcomes with normocaloric feeding or hypocaloric feeding, and found no difference. However, a comment criticized the inadequate control of protein intake, and raised concerns that hypocaloric feeding safety should be further assessed with underweight critically ill people.

See also 
 CR Society International
 Fasting
 Intermittent fasting
 List of diets
 Luigi Cornaro
 Mitohormesis
 Okinawa diet
 Very low calorie diet

References

Bibliography
 
 

Diets
Eating behaviors
Life extension
Senescence